Don Pope  (born January 10, 1972) from North Ridgeville, Ohio is an American former strongman competitor. He is best known for participating in the World's Strongest Man finals of 2005, 2006 and 2007. His best finish was 3rd at the 2006 World's Strongest Man competition. Don has a maximum dead lift of 800 pounds (363 kg), and can squat nearly 1000 pounds (450 kg). He is also a school teacher by trade.

References 

1972 births
Living people
American strength athletes
People from North Ridgeville, Ohio
People from Fairview Park, Ohio